Jay Thorimbert (born July 6, 1986, in Whitby, Ontario) is a professional Canadian lacrosse player, currently a member of the New York Riptide of the National Lacrosse League and the Kitchener-Waterloo Kodiaks of Major Series Lacrosse.

He was a member of the Buffalo Bandits in 2007, 2011 and 2012 and the Boston Blazers in 2008. While attending University of Guelph, he was a four-year captain for the lacrosse team. He was a three-time CUFLA All-Canadian, and in 2008 he was a member of the Championship team winning the Begattaway Cup. Thorimbert was named the 2008 CUFLA Most Valuable Player along with Most Valuable Midfield.

Thorimbert played junior lacrosse in the Ontario Lacrosse Association for the Niagara Thunderhawks (Jr. B) and Akwesasne Indians (Jr. A). He played in Major Series Lacrosse for the St. Regis Indians in 2008 and then traded to the Kitchener-Waterloo Kodiaks in 2009.

Statistics

NLL
Reference:

References

1986 births
Living people
Boston Blazers players
Buffalo Bandits players
Canadian lacrosse players
Lacrosse people from Ontario
Minnesota Swarm players
Sportspeople from Whitby, Ontario